Erik Pöysti (born 20 August 1955) is a Finnish film director and actor. He is the son of Finnish actors Lasse Pöysti and Birgitta Ulfsson.

Biography 
Pöysti studied at the University of Helsinki between 1975 and 1976. He worked at the Swedish Theatre during the early 1980s before moving onto the Lilla Teatern. In more recent years he has worked as a theatre teacher.

He currently lives in Ekenäs. His daughter Alma Pöysti is also an actress.

Filmography 

 Breaking Out (1982)
 Kiertue (1982)

References

External links 

 

1955 births
Male actors from Helsinki
Finnish male actors
Finnish dramatists and playwrights
Finnish people of German descent
Living people
Film people from Helsinki